Ada Thomas (July 31, 1924 – September 6, 1992) was a Chitimachan basket weaver who excelled in double-weave, split rivercane basketry. She was honored as a National Heritage Fellow by the National Endowment for the Arts in 1983. Examples of her weaving are housed in the permanent collections of the Birmingham Museum of Art, the Metropolitan Museum of Art and the Museum of International Folk Art, among others.

Early life
Ada Vilcan was born on July 31, 1924, on the Chitimacha Reservation, near Charenton, Louisiana, to Jane Bernard and Henry Vilcan. The fourth child in the family, her siblings were Alvin, Hollansworth, Esta/Esther, Raymond and Janet. Through the eighth grade, Thomas attended the reservation elementary school, where she also learned the Chitimacha basket weaving techniques from elders, Christine Navarro Paul and her sister-in-law Pauline. The baskets woven by Chitimacha women are unique in that the patterns on the inside and outside are different, as two separate baskets are woven and joined at the rim. Using split cane, known locally as piya, dyed with natural walnut, "la passiance" plant root and lime to produce the traditional black, red and yellow colors, the strips are woven to produce designs of traditional animals of the bayou. Alligators, blackbird's and cow's eyes, hearts, perch, snakes, and turtles are recurring motifs. The plain interior basket is woven first and once the rim is reached, the basket is turned and woven from the rim back to the bottom bringing in the colored design.

Career
After graduating from the reservation school, Vilcan moved to New Orleans, where she worked in an aircraft plant dedicated to the war effort. Though schools were segregated and Native Americans were not allowed to attend black or white high schools, government policy allowed plant workers to attend night school. Working by day and attending school at night, Vilcan was able to earn her high school diploma. Upon completing her schooling, she traveled the country, working at various jobs in Washington, D. C., New York City and Miami, Florida. In Miami, she met and married a jeweler and former New York City port official, Charles Thomas, with whom she had three sons: Arthur, Charles Henry, and Raymond.

When her husband died, Thomas returned to the Chitimacha Reservation in 1970, to raise her young sons. While they attended school, she revived the basket weaving craft she had learned as a child. The poverty which had plagued the tribe during the Great Depression when she left the area, had been replaced by prosperity with the growth in the oil industry. While the growth helped her tribal people economically, it also led to abandonment of their traditional crafts. Determined to save their unique basket weaving techniques, Thomas partnered with Stephen Richmond of the Indian Arts and Crafts Board to prepare a show held at Louisiana State University in Baton Rouge. Richmond helped her secure funds to teach others the techniques, though she had little success in the early days. In 1983, she was one of the artisans honored as a National Heritage Fellow by the National Endowment for the Arts.

Thomas taught basket weaving techniques at schools in Charenton and attended many festivals, like the New Orleans Jazz and Heritage Festival and the Folklife Festival hosted by the Smithsonian, to both show her works and demonstrate the craft. In her later years, she produced works primarily for privately held collections and museums.

Death and legacy
Thomas died on September 6, 1992, in Charenton. Examples of her weaving are housed in the permanent collections of the Birmingham Museum of Art, the Louisiana Folklife Program, the Metropolitan Museum of Art, the Museum of International Folk Art of Santa Fe, New Mexico and the collections of the Department of the Interior.

Notes

References

Citations

Bibliography

 reprinted in 

1924 births
1992 deaths
Chitimacha
People from St. Mary Parish, Louisiana
Native American basket weavers
20th-century Native Americans
20th-century American women artists
National Heritage Fellowship winners
20th-century Native American women